Heidi Andreasen (born 18 December 1985 in Tórshavn) is a Faroese swimmer.

She represented the Faroe Islands at the 2000 Summer Paralympics, winning three silver medals, in the S8 50m freestyle, the S8 100m freestyle, and the S8 400m freestyle, and a bronze in the S8 100m backstroke.

She was the Faroe Islands' sole representative at the 2004 Summer Paralympics, where she won the Islands' only medal: a bronze in the S8 400m freestyle, with a time of 5:26,29.

Andreasen competed again at the 2008 Summer Paralympics, and was the Faroe Islands' flagbearer during the Games' opening ceremony. She did not win a medal. It was her last participation in the Paralympic Games.

There were no Olympic-sized pools in the Faroe Islands, where Andreasen trained in a 25-metre pool.

Notes

External links
 

Paralympic swimmers of the Faroe Islands
Swimmers at the 2000 Summer Paralympics
Swimmers at the 2004 Summer Paralympics
Swimmers at the 2008 Summer Paralympics
Paralympic silver medalists for the Faroe Islands
Paralympic bronze medalists for the Faroe Islands
Faroese female swimmers
Living people
1985 births
People from Tórshavn
Medalists at the 2000 Summer Paralympics
Medalists at the 2004 Summer Paralympics
Paralympic medalists in swimming
S8-classified Paralympic swimmers